Kuşköy (English meaning is "Village of the Birds") is a village in Çanakçı district of Giresun province in the Black Sea region of Turkey. The village is famous for its 400-year-old whistled language that is used by the local residents.

Population

See also 
 Turkish bird language

References 

Villages in Çanakçı District